Denying the antecedent, sometimes also called inverse error or fallacy of the inverse, is a formal fallacy of inferring the inverse from the original statement. It is committed by reasoning in the form:

If P, then Q.
Therefore, if not P, then not Q.

which may also be phrased as

    (P implies Q)
    (therefore, not-P implies not-Q)

Arguments of this form are invalid. Informally, this means that arguments of this form do not give good reason to establish their conclusions, even if their premises are true. In this example, a valid conclusion would be: ~P or Q.

The name denying the antecedent derives from the premise "not P", which denies the "if" clause of the conditional premise.

One way to demonstrate the invalidity of this argument form is with an example that has true premises but an obviously false conclusion. For example:

If you are a ski instructor, then you have a job.
You are not a ski instructor.
Therefore, you have no job.

That argument is intentionally bad, but arguments of the same form can sometimes seem superficially convincing, as in the following example offered by Alan Turing in the article "Computing Machinery and Intelligence":

However, men could still be machines that do not follow a definite set of rules. Thus, this argument (as Turing intends) is invalid.

It is possible that an argument that denies the antecedent could be valid if the argument instantiates some other valid form. For example, if the claims P and Q express the same proposition, then the argument would be trivially valid, as it would beg the question. In everyday discourse, however, such cases are rare, typically only occurring when the "if-then" premise is actually an "if and only if" claim (i.e., a biconditional/equality). The following argument is not valid, but would be if the first premise was "If I can veto Congress, then I am the US President." This claim is now modus tollens, and thus valid.

If I am President of the United States, then I can veto Congress.
I am not President.
Therefore, I cannot veto Congress.

See also 
 Affirming the consequent
 Modus ponens
 Modus tollens
 Necessity and sufficiency

References

External links 
 FallacyFiles.org: Denying the Antecedent
 safalra.com: Denying The Antecedent

Propositional fallacies
Dichotomies